Sir Paul Gavrilovitch Vinogradoff  (transliterated: Pavel Gavrilovich Vinogradov; 18 November 1854 (O.S.)19 December 1925) was a Russian and British historian and medievalist.

Early life 
Vinogradoff was born in Kostroma and was educated at the local gymnasium and Moscow University, where he studied history under Vasily Klyuchevsky. After graduating in 1875, he obtained a scholarship to continue his studies in Berlin, where he studied under Theodor Mommsen and Heinrich Brunner.

Career
Vinogradoff became professor of history at the University of Moscow, but his zeal for the spread of education brought him into conflict with the authorities, and consequently he was obliged to leave Russia. Having settled in England, Vinogradoff brought a powerful and original mind to bear upon the social and economic conditions of early England, a subject which he had already begun to study in Moscow.

Vinogradoff visited Britain for the first time in 1883, working on records in the Public Records Office and meeting leading English scholars such as Sir Henry Maine and Sir Frederick Pollock. He also met Frederic William Maitland, who was heavily influenced by their meeting.

Vinogradoff was elected a member of the American Antiquarian Society in 1897.

In 1903 he was elected to the position of Corpus Professor of Jurisprudence at the University of Oxford, and held this position until he died in 1925. He was elected a Fellow of the British Academy in 1905. He received honorary degrees from the principal universities (including D.C.L. from the University of Oxford in October 1902, in connection with the tercentenary of the Bodleian Library.), was made a member of several foreign academies and was appointed honorary professor of history at Moscow.

Upon the death of Maitland, Vinogradoff became the literary director of the Selden Society with Sir Frederick Pollock, a position he held until 1920. During World War I he gave valuable assistance to the British Foreign Office in connection with Russian affairs. Vinogradoff was knighted in 1917, and he and his children were naturalized as British subjects in 1918.

In 1925, Vinogradoff traveled to Paris to receive an honorary degree; while in Paris, he developed pneumonia and died there on 19 December.

Books
According to the Encyclopædia Britannica Eleventh Edition, published in 1911, Vinogradoff's  Villainage in England (1892) was "perhaps the most important book written on the peasantry of the feudal age and the village community in England; it can only be compared for value with FW Maitland's Domesday Book and Beyond. In masterly fashion Vinogradoff here shows that the villein of Norman times was the direct descendant of the Anglo-Saxon freeman, and that the typical Anglo-Saxon settlement was a free community, not a manor, the position of the freeman having steadily deteriorated in the centuries just around the Norman Conquest. The status of the villein and the conditions of the manor in the 12th and 13th centuries are set forth with a legal precision and a wealth of detail which shows its author, not only as a very capable historian, but also as a brilliant and learned jurist."

The article considered that almost equally valuable was Vinogradoff's essay on “Folkland” in vol. viii. of the English Historical Review (1893), which proved for the first time the real nature of this kind of land. Vinogradoff followed up his Villainage in England with The Growth of the Manor (1905) and English Society in the Eleventh Century (1908), works on the lines of his earlier book.

In Outlines in Historical Jurisprudence (1920–22), Vinogradoff traces the development of basic themes of jurisprudence, including marriage, property, and succession, in six different types of society: the totemistic, the tribal, the ancient city state, the medieval system of feudalism and canon law, and modern industrial society.

Works
 The Origins of Feudal Relations in Lombard Italy, 1880.
 Villainage in England, Clarendon Press, [publ. 1887; trans. to English 1892].
 The Teaching of Sir Henry Maine: An Inaugural Lecture, Henry Frowde, 1904. 
 The Growth of the Manor, George Allen & Company, 1911 [1st Pub. 1905].
 English Society in the Eleventh Century, Oxford: Clarendon Press, 1908.
 Roman Law in Medieval Europe, Harper & Brothers, 1909.
 Essays in Legal History Read Before the International Congress of Historical Studies, held in London in 1913, Oxford University Press, 1913.
 Common-sense in Law, H. Holt and Company, 1914.
 Self-government in Russia, Constable, 1915.
 Outlines in Historical Jurisprudence (Introduction and Tribal Law), Oxford University Press, 1920.
 Outlines in Historical Jurisprudence (The Jurisprudence of the Greek City), Oxford University Press, 1922.
 Custom and Right, H. Aschehoug & Co., 1925.
 The Collected Papers of Paul Vinogradoff, 2 Vol., Oxford, The Clarendon Press, 1928.

Other
 "The Reforming Work of Tzar Alexander II." In Kirkpatrick, F. A., Lectures on the History of the Nineteenth Century, Cambridge University Press, 1902.
 "Social and Economic Conditions of the Roman Empire in the Fourth Century." In Gwatkin, H. M. The Cambridge Medieval History, Vol. I, The MacMillan Company, 1911.
 "Foundations of Society (Origins of Feudalism)." In Gwatkin, H. H. The Cambridge Medieval History, Vol. II, The MacMillan Company, 1913.
 "Russian Culture." In Bingham, Alfred. Handbook of the European War, Vol. II, H. W. Wilson Company, 1914.
 "Russia: The Psychology of a Nation," Oxford Pamphlets, Oxford University Press, 1914.
 The Russian Problem, George H. Doran Co., 1914.
 "The Task of Russia." In Stephens, Winifred. The Soul of Russia, Macmillan & Co., 1916.
 "Magna Carta, C. 39. Nullus Liber Homo, etc." In Malden, Henry Elliot. Magna Carta Commemoration Essays, Royal Historical Society, 1917.
 "The Situation in Russia." In The Reconstruction of Russia, Oxford University Press, 1919.
 "Introduction." In Hübner, Rudolf. A History of Germanic Private Law, Little, Brown & Company, 1918.
 "The Work of Rome." In Marvin, F. S. The Evolution of Peace, Oxford University Press, 1921.

As editor
 Oxford Studies in Social and Legal History, Vol. IV, Oxford: Clarendon Press, 1914.

Articles
 "The Customs of Ragusa," The Law Quarterly Review, Vol. XXI, 1905.
 "Magna Carta," The Law Quarterly Review, Vol. XXI, 1905.
 "A Constitutional History of Hungary," The Law Quarterly Review, Vol. XXI, 1905.
 "Transfer of Land in Old English Law," The Harvard Law Review, Vol. 20, No. 7, May, 1907.
 "Aristotle on Legal Redress," Columbia Law Review, Vol. 8, No. 7, Nov., 1908.
 "The Crisis of Modern Jurisprudence," The Yale Law Journal, Vol. 29, No. 3, Jan., 1920.
 "The Meaning of Legal History," Columbia Law Review, Vol. 22, No. 8, Dec., 1922.

Notes

References

External links
 
 
 
 
 Paul Govrilovitch (sic) Vinogradoff: at McMaster University Archive for the History of Economic Thought

19th-century historians from the Russian Empire
Russian medievalists
Full members of the Saint Petersburg Academy of Sciences
Full Members of the Russian Academy of Sciences (1917–1925)
Full Members of the USSR Academy of Sciences
1854 births
1925 deaths
Anglo-Saxon studies scholars
Emigrants from the Russian Empire to the United Kingdom
Professors of Jurisprudence (University of Oxford)
Knights Bachelor
Fellows of the British Academy
20th-century British historians
Legal historians
British medievalists
Members of the American Antiquarian Society
Professorships at the Imperial Moscow University
Deaths from pneumonia in France
Imperial Moscow University alumni